Samuel Vita della Volta (24 September 1772 – 29 March 1853), also known by the acronyms  and , was an Italian physician and Hebraist, who flourished in Mantua. He wrote a number of commentaries, sermons, and responsa (especially on medical issues), which remain in manuscript.

Della Volta was the owner of a large Hebrew library, which, together with its 131 manuscripts, came into the possession of Marco Mortara. He was also a contributor to the periodical . A letter from Isaac Samuel Reggio to Della Volta appeared in Otzar Neḥmad (III, pp. 25–27), and several letters between him and Samuel David Luzzatto are preserved in his Epistolario italiano, francese, latino (1890).

Selected works
The following works are held in the Kaufmann manuscript collection at the Hungarian Academy of Sciences in Budapest:

 Kuntras ktiv ismaḥ (1791). Commentaries, sermons, and responsa.
 Kuntras ayin be-ayin (1792). Talmudic commentaries.
 Igerot. Correspondences from 1793 to 1797.
 Kuntras Torah or (1794). Biblical commentaries.
 Derekh drash (I, 1794; II, 1797)
 Dan yadin (1797).
 Preface to Shlomo Norzi's Minḥat shai (1819).
 Igerot el maskilei ha-dor be-Italia. Correspondences from 1838 to 1840.
 Kilutim. Assorted historical texts and poems in Hebrew and Italian.
 Likutim. Sermons.
 Meshiv nefesh. Prayers for Yom Kippur.

References

External links
 Digitized works of Dalla Volta at the National Library of Israel

1772 births
1853 deaths
18th-century Italian Jews
19th-century Italian Jews
Bible commentators
Book and manuscript collectors
Italian bibliophiles
Jewish physicians
University of Ferrara alumni
People from Mantua